Stefan Minkwitz (born 1 June 1969 in Magdeburg) is a German football coach and former player.

A midfielder, he appeared in 82 German top-flight matches in his career - 72 in the DDR-Oberliga and ten in the German unified Bundesliga. Minkwitz won two caps for the East Germany national team in 1990.

References

External links
 
 
 

1968 births
Living people
Sportspeople from Magdeburg
German footballers
East German footballers
East Germany international footballers
Association football midfielders
1. FC Magdeburg players
MSV Duisburg players
Fortuna Düsseldorf players
Stuttgarter Kickers players
Bundesliga players
2. Bundesliga players
German football managers
Stuttgarter Kickers managers
DDR-Oberliga players
3. Liga managers
SSV Reutlingen 05 managers
SV Elversberg managers
Footballers from Saxony-Anhalt